Tennessee elected its members August 2–3, 1827, after the term began but before the new Congress convened.

See also 
 1826 and 1827 United States House of Representatives elections
 List of United States representatives from Tennessee

Notes 

1827
Tennessee
United States House of Representatives